WKBN (570 kHz) is a commercial AM radio station in Youngstown, Ohio.  It has a talk radio format and is owned by iHeartMedia, Inc.  The studios and offices are on South Avenue in Youngstown.

WKBN is powered at 5,000 watts. By day, it has a non-directional signal covering Northeast Ohio, Western Pennsylvania and a section of West Virginia.  At night, it uses a six-tower array directional antenna to protect other stations on 570 AM.  The transmitter is on East Western Reserve Road at Beard Road in Poland, Ohio.

Programming
WKBN has two local talk hosts on weekdays, Dan Rivers in late mornings and Ron Verb during afternoon drive time.  The rest of the weekday schedule is made up of nationally syndicated conservative talk shows, mostly from co-owned Premiere Networks.  They include Sean Hannity, Joe Pags, Coast to Coast AM with George Noory and This Morning, America's First News with Gordon Deal.

On weekends, specialty programs on money, health, home improvement, technology, cars, veterans, real estate and the outdoors are heard, as well as repeats of weekday shows.  Weekend syndicated shows include At Home with Gary Sullivan, Leo Laporte The Tech Guy, The Truth About Money with Ric Edelman, Somewhere in Time with Art Bell and Sunday Night Live with Bill Cunningham.  Some weekend hours are paid brokered programming.  Most hours begin with world and national news from ABC News Radio.  The station also carries games for the Cleveland Guardians baseball team and Youngstown State Penguins football and basketball.

History

Early years
The station was founded in 1926 by Warren P. Williamson, Jr. (1900–1996). It is Youngstown's oldest continuing operating radio station, signing on the air on September 26, 1926.  It originally broadcast on 1400 kilocycles at 50 watts.

The studios were in the basement of Williamson's home, but by the following year operations had moved to studios in the YMCA Building in downtown Youngstown.  The license was held by the Radio Electric Service Co., and later WKBN Broadcasting Corporation. With the implementation of the FRC's General Order 40 on November 11, 1928, the station moved 570 kHz where it remains today.

CBS programming
Shortly after WKBN's launch, the station became a charter affiliate of the newly formed CBS Radio Network, a partnership that would last until the end of the century.  WKBN carried CBS's schedule of dramas, comedies, news, sports, soap operas, game shows and big band broadcasts during the "Golden Age of Radio."  For many years, WKBN was one of only two radio stations licensed to Youngstown.  (WFMJ, now WNIO, signed on in 1939.)  The station also broadcast some shows on Radio Luxembourg to American troops in Europe during World War II.

On February 8, 1943, Alan Freed started his early radio career on WKBN.  He later went on to a career as a noted rock and roll disc jockey.

MOR and talk
As network programming moved to TV from radio in the 1950s, WKBN switched from CBS shows to a middle of the road format of popular music, news, sports and talk.  As listeners increasingly tuned to FM for music, WKBN added more talk programming.  By the 1990s, the music shows had ended as WKBN transitioned to all talk, with frequent news updates and sports coverage.

FM and TV stations
Warren Williamson started 98.9 WKBN-FM in 1948.  At first, it simulcast the same programming as the AM station.  In the 1960s, 1970s and 1980s, it carried an automated beautiful music format.  The FM station is now adult contemporary WMXY.

He also started WKBN-TV in 1953, which became a predominantly CBS-TV affiliate in part due to the AM station's long history with the radio network. WKBN-TV to this day has retained the CBS-TV affiliation.  In 1997, the TV station was sold to Gocom, while WKBN-AM-FM would later be sold to a different owner.

Changes in ownership
On January 22, 1999, the Williamson family sold WKBN and WKBN-FM to Jacor Communications, ending 73 years of family ownership. Jacor, however, did not own the stations very long.

On April 29, 1999, Clear Channel Communications completed its $6.5 billion purchase of Jacor and its 454 stations, including WKBN and WKBN-FM. In September 2014, Clear Channel Communications became iHeartMedia, Inc.

Former staff members
Jack Berch began his radio career at WKBN.  He went on to have The Jack Berch Show, which ran at various times on four networks (1935-1954).
Alan Freed began his radio career at WKST in New Castle, PA. before moving on to WKBN in Youngstown,Ohio. He went on to become a disc jockey on stations such as 850 WJW Cleveland and 1010 WINS New York City.  Leo Mintz, owner of Record Rendezvous and sponsor of the first Moondog Coronation Ball in Cleveland, Ohio, on March 21, 1952, is credited with calling young people's popular music by the term "Rock and Roll."

References

External links

FCC History Cards for WKBN

KBN
IHeartMedia radio stations
News and talk radio stations in the United States
Radio stations established in 1926
1926 establishments in Ohio